Nambu Bus Terminal Station is a subway station on the Seoul Subway Line 3 in Seocho-gu, Seoul.  Its substation name is Seoul Arts Center. As its name indicates, it serves the nearby Nambu Bus Terminal.  It is also the closest station to the Seoul Arts Center, located about a half-mile southwest of here.  When this line opened, this station was called the Cargo Truck Terminal.

Station layout

Vicinity
Exit 1 : Seoul National University of Education
Exit 2 :
Exit 3 : International Electronics Centre
Exit 4 :
Exit 5 : Nambu Bus Terminal, Seoul Arts Center
Exit 6 :

References

Metro stations in Seocho District
Seoul Metropolitan Subway stations
Railway stations in South Korea opened in 1985
Seoul Subway Line 3